Peter André Perchtold (born 2 September 1984) is a German football coach and former player who played as a midfielder and he is the currently assistant manager Bundesliga club of VfB Stuttgart.

Club career 
Perchtold was born in Nuremberg. In October 2007, he was promoted to the first team of VfB Stuttgart. He had his professional debut on 20 October 2007 against Hamburger SV.

In July 2008, he moved to 1. FC Nürnberg.

In January 2011, he moved to A-League club Gold Coast United. He was sacked by Gold Coast United for not agreeing to cancel the final year of his two-year contract.  In December 2011, an arbitrator ruled against Gold Coast United in this case and damages were awarded to Perchtold – including an amount for the impact to Perchtold's career due to the unfair sacking.

In July 2011, he joined 1. FSV Mainz 05 II and was made the side's captain. He was suspended until the end of August 2011 (four matches) after receiving a red card in his first match where his team lost 2–1 to Rot-Weiss Essen in round 1 of the Regionalliga West 2011–12 season.

Coaching career 
In 2013 he became assistant coach of Martin Schmidt at 1. FSV Mainz 05 II. Two years later Perchtold got the same position in the Bundesliga team of 1. FSV Mainz 05. He joined FC Schalke 04 as assistant of Domenico Tedesco in 2017. In 2020 Perchtold became assistant coach of Pellegrino Matarazzo at VfB Stuttgart.

References

External links

 Peter Perchtold Interview

Living people
1984 births
German people of Austrian descent
Footballers from Nuremberg
German footballers
Association football midfielders
Bundesliga players
2. Bundesliga players
VfB Stuttgart players
VfB Stuttgart II players
1. FC Nürnberg players
A-League Men players
Gold Coast United FC players
1. FSV Mainz 05 II players
German expatriate footballers
German expatriate sportspeople in Australia
Expatriate soccer players in Australia